In inorganic chemistry and materials chemistry, a ternary compound or ternary phase is a chemical compound containing three different elements. 

While some ternary compounds are molecular, e.g. chloroform, more typically ternary phases refer to extended solids.  Famous example are the perovskites.

Binary phases, with only two elements, have lower degrees of complexity than ternary phases.  With four elements, quaternary phases are more complex.

The number of isomers of a ternary compound provide a distinction between inorganic and organic chemistry: "In inorganic chemistry one or, at most, only a few compounds composed of any two or three elements were known, whereas in organic chemistry the situation was very different."

Ternary crystalline compounds

An example is sodium phosphate, . The sodium ion has a charge of 1+ and the phosphate ion has a charge of 3–. Therefore, three sodium ions are needed to balance the charge of one phosphate ion. Another example of a ternary compound is calcium carbonate, . In naming and writing the formulae for ternary compounds, rules are similar to binary compounds.

Classifications of ternary crystals
According to Rustum Roy and Olaf Müller, "the chemistry of the entire mineral world informs us that chemical complexity can easily be accommodated within structural simplicity." The example of zircon is cited, where various metal atoms are replaced in the same crystal structure. "The structural entity ... remains ternary in character and is able to accommodate an enormous range of chemical elements." The great variety of ternary compounds is therefore reduced to relatively few structures: "By dealing with approximately ten ternary structural groupings we can cover the most important structures of science and technology specific to the non-metallics world. It is a remarkable instance of nature's simplexity."

A ternary compound of type  may be in the class of olivine, the spinel group, or phenakite.

One of type  may be of the class of zircon, scheelite, barite or an ordered silicon dioxide derivative.

In the  class of ternary compounds, there are the structures of perovskite (structure), calcium carbonate, pyroxenes, corundum and hexagonal  types.

Ternary semiconductors

A particular class of ternary compounds are the ternary semiconductors, particularly within the III-V semiconductor family. In this type of semiconductor, the ternary can be considered to be an alloy of the two binary endpoints. Varying the composition between the endpoints allows both the lattice constant and the energy bandgap to be adjusted to produce the properties desired, for example, in emitting light (for example, as a LED) or absorbing light (as a photodetector or a photovoltaic cell).  An example would be the semiconductor indium gallium arsenide, a material with band gap dependent on In/Ga ratio.

Organics
In organic chemistry, the carbohydrates and carboxylic acids are ternary compounds with carbon, oxygen, and hydrogen. Other organic ternary compounds replace oxygen with another atom to form functional groups.

The  multiplicity of ternary compounds based on {C, H, O} has  been noted. For example, C9 H10 O3 corresponds to more than 60 ternary compounds.

See also
 Binary compound
 Mitscherlich's law of isomorphism
 Quaternary phase

References

Chemical compounds